Ramechhap District, a part of Bagmati Province, is one of the seventy-seven districts of Nepal, a landlocked country of South Asia.

According to LLRCNepal there are now eight local administrations in the district: Manthali Municipality, Ramechhap Municipality, Umakunda Rural Municipality, Khandadevi Rural Municipality, Gokulganga Rural Municipality, Doramba Rural Municipality, Likhu Rural Municipality and Sunapati Rural Municipality.

The district has the highest population of the endangered native group the Kusunda and has the lowest population growth rate in Nepal.

Etymology
The district was named after Ramechhap village. The word Ramechhap comes from two Nepali words, Ram (person's name) and Chhap (mark). According to folklore, the village of Ramechhap was once occupied by Tamang people. A Tamang of the village, Ram by name received mukhtiyari of the village by royal decree. So, the land ownership and other legal activities were performed in the village by the stamp (chhap) of Ram.

Similarly, according to another folklore, the grassland of Ramechhap village was occupied by Tamang people. Those people daily used to rear their domesticated animals such as Buffalo, Goat and others in the open meadow. In Tamang language, "Ra" means Goat, "Mey" means ox, and "Chhawa" means their small offspring. By the time and mouth to mouth pronunciation the meadow has become "Ramechhap" and later the place has been named Ramechhap. Hence, the district is called Ramechhap.

Geography and climate

Demographics
At the time of the 2011 Nepal census, Ramechhap District had a population of 202,646. Of these, 59.4% spoke Nepali, 18.3% Tamang, 6.9% Newari, 5.2% Magar, 5.1% Sherpa, 3.7% Sunuwar, 2.1% Majhi, 1.6% Sherpa, 1.0% Thangmi, 0.5% Yolmo, 0.2% Vayu, 0.2% Maithili, 0.2% Pahari and 0.1% other languages as their first language.

In terms of ethnicity/caste, 26.8% Chhetri, 19.2% Tamang, 14.5% Newar, 11.2% Magar, 4.8% Hill Brahmin, 4.2% Sunuwar, 3.2% Kami, 3.1% Sarki, 3.0% Majhi, 2.3% Damai/Dholi, 2.0% Sherpa, 1.6% Gharti/Bhujel, 1.0% Thami, 0.8% Sanyasi/Dasnami, 0.5% Yolmo, 0.4% Hayu, 0.4% Pahari, 0.2% other Dalit, 0.1% Badi, 0.1% Gurung and 0.2% others.

In terms of religion, 71.9% were Hindu, 24.7% Buddhist, 1.6% Christian, 1.4% Prakriti and 0.3% others.

In terms of literacy, 62.0% could read and write, 3.7% could only read and 34.2% could neither read nor write.

Old Village Development Committees (VDCs)

Bamti Bhandar
Betali
Bethan
Bhirpani
Bhuji
Bijulikot
Chisapani Municipality
Chanakhu
Chuchure
Dadhuwa
Duragaun
Deurali
Dimipokhari
Doramba
Duragau
Gagal Bhadaure
Gelu
Goswara
Gothgau
Gumdel
Gunsi Bhadaure
Gupteshwar
Hiledevi
Himganga
Khandadevi
Khaniyapani
Khimti
Kumbukasthali
Lakhanpur
Majuwa
Makadum
Manthali Municipality
Naga Daha
Namadi
Pakarbas
Pharpu
Phulasi
Piukhuri
Priti
Puranagau
Rakathum
Ramechhap Municipality
Rampur
Rashnailu
Saipu
Sanghutar
Those
Tilpung
Tokarpur

Newly formed local administrative bodies

See also
Zones of Nepal
Thangmi language

References

External links
 

 
Districts of Nepal established during Rana regime or before
Districts of Bagmati Province